Bulgaria made its Paralympic Games début at the 1988 Summer Paralympics in Seoul, sending three competitors in track and field, and a men's goalball team. The country has participated in every subsequent edition of the Summer Paralympics. It made its Winter Paralympics début in 1994, and has taken part in every edition of the Winter Games since then.

Bulgarian athletes have won a total of five gold medals, nine silver and three bronze. All these medals have been won at the Summer Games, and all but one in track and field; the exception is Polina Dzhurova's silver medal in swimming in 1996, in the women's 100m backstroke (S6 category).

1988 was Bulgaria's most successful year. Gueorgui Sakelarov became the country's first Paralympic champion when he took gold in both the discus and the shot put (B2 category). Compatriot Donko Angelov won Bulgaria's third medal of the Games, a silver, in the triple jump (B3). Ivan Hristov narrowly missed out on a medal when he finished fourth in the high jump (B1).

Sakelarov has won three of Bulgaria's five Paralympic gold medals. He successfully defended his title in the shot put in 1992, though he won "only" silver in the discus that year. Bulgaria's fifth and most recent gold medal was won by Ruzhdi Ruzhdi in the men's shot put (F54-55) in 2016.

Medal tallies

Summer Paralympics

Winter Paralympics

Medallists

Summer Games

Winter Games

See also
 Bulgaria at the Olympics

References